Grunty may refer to:
 A cow-like creature from the .hack series. See Grunties .
 Gruntilda, the main villain of the Banjo-Kazooie series.

See also

 Grunt (disambiguation)